Empress Huyan (呼延皇后, personal name unknown) was an empress of the Xiongnu-led Chinese Han Zhao dynasty.  She was the founding emperor Liu Yuan (Emperor Guangwen)'s first wife.

The Huyans were likely a great clan of Xiongnu nobility, as Liu Yuan's mother was also named Huyan, making his wife likely a relative of his mother. There were also many Huyans who were important in Han Zhao's government. However, little is known about Empress Huyan herself, other than that when Liu Yuan declared himself Prince of Han in 304, he created her princess. Her father name was Huyan Yi (呼延翼). It was later implied that she was created empress sometime after he declared himself emperor in 307, although the date was not mentioned. She bore him at least one son, Liu He, who later became crown prince and emperor briefly. It is not known when she died, but she appeared to have been dead at least by 310, when Liu Yuan created his second empress, Empress Dan.

|-

3rd-century births
300s deaths
Former Zhao empresses
4th-century Chinese women
4th-century Chinese people